Pirnmill is a small village on the north-west coast of the Isle of Arran, Scotland. The village is situated on the Kilbrannan Sound, facing Grogport on the Kintyre peninsula.

Located within the parish of Kilmory, Pirnmill is flanked by several clachans, including Whitefarland to the south, Thunderguy to the north, and the original settlement of Penrioch (Scottish Gaelic: Peighinn Riabhach) above the village.

Etymology
Unlike many of the other villages on the island, Pirnmill's etymology is not rooted in the Gaelic or Norse heritage of Arran; rather Pirnmill takes its name from a mill that historically stood there until 1840, which produced pirns (wooden rods used in weaving) for Clarks (latterly Coats) of Paisley, which was operational from 1780 to 1840.

History
Early inhabitants of Pirnmill made a living through seasonal herring fishing or crofting, but later the village became a tourist destination, with many Clyde steamers plying between Glasgow and Campbeltown. The village was served by a small ferry boats that would be rowed out to the steamers, and visitors would have to decant into the small ferry to be rowed ashore. The last of these local ferry men was Archibald Currie (Sunnyside), who eventually fitted a small engine to one of his boats. The steamers were stopped during the Second World War and never really reinstated. The overwhelming majority of visitors now come to the village by road, with a few arriving by private yacht.

The jetty below the shop was built in the 1930s to make it easier for visitors (and cargo) to disembark from the small ferries. Prior to this there were only duckboards.

Economy
Pirnmill has a church, village shop, restaurant and a B&B, as well as a monthly 'Pop Up Pub'.  north of the village, halfway between Pirnmill and Catacol, there is an ancient burial ground close to the shore at Rhubha Airigh Bheirg.

Notable people
Flora Drummond - suffragette

References

External links

Canmore - Arran, Pirnmill, General site record
Canmore - Arran, Pirnmill, Pirnmill Church site record

Villages in the Isle of Arran